Earth Run is the fifteenth studio album by jazz guitarist Lee Ritenour, released in April 1986 through GRP Records. The album reached number ten on the Billboard Jazz Albums chart in the United States and received a Grammy Award nomination for Grammy Award for Best Jazz Fusion Performance, Vocal or Instrumental. The title track was also nominated for Best Instrumental Composition.

Critical reception

Richard S. Ginell at AllMusic awarded Earth Run 2.5 stars out of 5, calling it "a more interesting record than most of its immediate predecessors" and noting the "peculiarly fuzzy, futuristic sound" of Ritenour's SynthAxe guitar synthesizer (as depicted on the cover art; one of nine different guitars used on the album). He also listed "The Sauce" and the cover of Herbie Hancock's "Butterfly" as highlights.

Track listing

Personnel

Lee Ritenour – guitar, SynthAxe, arrangement (tracks 1–3, 5–9), production
Phil Perry – lead vocals (track 3)
Maurice White – vocals (track 3)
Tommy Funderburk – vocals (track 3)
Ernie Watts – tenor saxophone
Tom Scott – Lyricon
Larry Williams – SynthAxe programming (tracks 1, 2), synthesizer programming (track 3)
Dave Grusin – keyboard (tracks 1, 2, 4, 6, 9), piano, arrangement (tracks 2, 4, 7, 9), executive production
Don Grusin – keyboard (track 7), synthesizer (track 4)
Greg Mathieson – keyboard (track 5), bass synthesizer (track 5), arrangement (track 5), producer
David Foster – keyboard (track 3), bass synthesizer, (track 3), arrangement (track 3)
Carlos Vega – drums (tracks 1–3, 5–7, 9)
Harvey Mason – drums (track 8)
Paulinho da Costa – percussion
Jimmy Johnson – bass (tracks 1, 4, 7, 9)
Abraham Laboriel – bass (tracks 2, 6)
Marcus Ryle – SynthAxe programming (tracks 1, 2), synthesizer programming (track 7)
Casey Young – synthesizer programming (track 5)
Jerry Hey – horn arrangement (track 1)
Larry Rosen – executive production

Charts

References

External links
Earth Run at Lee Ritenour's official site

1986 albums
GRP Records albums
Lee Ritenour albums
Albums produced by Dave Grusin